David Charles Maurer (born February 23, 1975) is an American former Major League Baseball player. A pitcher, Maurer played for the San Diego Padres ( and ), Cleveland Indians, and Toronto Blue Jays.

Maurer attended Apple Valley High School in Apple Valley, Minnesota. He played college baseball at Howard College and Oklahoma State University. In 1996, he played collegiate summer baseball with the Orleans Cardinals of the Cape Cod Baseball League. He was selected by the Padres in the 11th round of the 1997 MLB Draft.

References

External links

1975 births
Living people
American expatriate baseball players in Canada
Baseball players from Minneapolis
Buffalo Bisons (minor league) players
Cleveland Indians players
Clinton LumberKings players
Howard Hawks baseball players
Las Vegas Stars (baseball) players
Louisville RiverBats players
Major League Baseball pitchers
Mobile BayBears players
Oklahoma State Cowboys baseball players
Orleans Firebirds players
Portland Beavers players
Rancho Cucamonga Quakes players
Sacramento River Cats players
San Diego Padres players
Syracuse SkyChiefs players
Toronto Blue Jays players
Apple Valley High School (Minnesota) alumni